The Von Brauners were a professional wrestling tag team/stable that operated from the 1950s through the 1970s. The teams consisted of Karl Von Brauner (Doug Donnan), Kurt Von Brauner #1 (Jimmy Brawner), Eric Von Brauner (Ron Donnan), and Kurt Von Brauner #2 (Willy Rutgowsky). The chosen gimmick was that of a team of evil German twins.

The four members worked as the Von Brauners for approximately fifteen years. The team of Karl and Kurt #1 captured World Tag Team gold 20 times. All versions of the team captured a total of 35 World Tag Team titles plus 5 regional tag team titles.

Professional wrestling career
Jimmy Brawner and Doug Donovan began tag teaming together in January 1960 as Kurt and Karl Von Brauner, respectively, with the gimmick of evil German twins. Some promotional material cited them as descending from Teutonic royalty. Fellow professional wrestler Dick Steinborn suggested the two wrestle together after noting that they resembled each other. The duo first teamed together in Oklahoma. They were paired with Saul Weingeroff as their manager in the early 1960s, and Weingeroff frequently interfered in their matches by wielding his cane against the Von Brauners' opponents. Later, they were booked by Nick Gulas in NWA Mid-America. When Jimmy Brauner and Doug Donovan split up in 1965, Donovan's real life brother Ron "Red" Donnan began teaming with him as Karl and Eric Von Brauner. Eric retired in the late 1960s and was replaced by the second Kurt Von Brauner, played by Willy Rutgowsky. The teamed together in San Francisco with Gerhardt Kaiser as their manager. The team disbanded in 1974.

Personal lives

Karl Von Brauner
Doug Donovan played the Karl Von Brauner character. He was born Doug Donnan on a dairy farm in Stirling, Ontario. He played junior football in Edmonton, Alberta. While working at a gym, Stu Hart "discovered" Donovan and trained him to be a professional wrestler. During his wrestling years, he changed his name to Donovan, and at 5′10″, he weighed 215 pounds. Donovan had some early success with Pacific Northwest Wrestling as a singles wrestler, winning the NWA Pacific Northwest Heavyweight Championship once, as well as the NWA Pacific Northwest Tag Team Championship five times (including twice with his brother Red). Later, Donovan legally changed his name to Karl Von Brauner.

In the mid-1960s, Donovan teamed with Al Costello as The Internationals with Gary Hart as their manager. The team was later managed by George "Crybaby" Cannon. The Internationals worked mainly in Tennessee and Texas for NWA Western States. In Texas, they won the Texas version of the NWA World Tag Team Championship. Donovan also later held this title with partner Luke Graham. The Internationals were also billed as the first NWA American Tag Team Champions, titles that were also recognized by World Class Championship Wrestling in addition to the Western States promotion. The Internationals lost the American Tag Team title to Fritz and Waldo Von Erich on February 21, 1967.

After retiring from professional wrestling in 1975, Donovan moved to California and worked as an air freight pilot. In the years before his death, he worked as a crop duster. He had a wife Sherry and two sons named Jeff and Chris. After a stroke and open heart surgery, he died on July 5, 2009.

Kurt Von Brauner #1
Jimmy Brawner played the first version of Kurt Von Brauner. Brawner was originally from Tennessee. He was of German heritage and was able to speak German, as well. Brawner later legally changed his name to Kurt Von Brawner to protect kayfabe. After retiring from professional wrestling, he worked for the Southland Corporation in Tampa and later for the Shriners as chief of security for their hospital. Brawner died from a stroke on July 4, 2004. He lived in Tampa with his wife JoAnn until his death.

Eric Von Brauner
Doug Donovan's real life brother Ron "Red" Donnan played Eric Von Brauner. Red was two years younger than his brother Doug, but he was also born on a dairy farm in Stirling, Ontario. Red worked for the Royal Canadian Air Force.

He trained as a professional wrestler with Bert Ruby in Detroit. In the late 1950s, he worked in Pacific Northwest Wrestling, where he held the NWA Pacific Northwest Tag Team Championship twice with his brother. Red retired from professional wrestling in the late 1960s and joined the fire department in Memphis. He later moved to Covington, Georgia.

Kurt Von Brauner #2
The second incarnation of Kurt Von Brauner was played by Willy Rutgowsky, who also previously wrestled under the name Kurt Von Stroheim. Under the Von Stroheim name, Rutgowsky teamed with the original Kurt Von Brauner, Jimmy Brawner. He was also of German heritage, and was interned by the Nazis during World War II before becoming a professional wrestler. Rutgowsky died on February 17, 1993.

Championships and accomplishments

Karl and Kurt Von Brauner
 Western States Sports
 NWA World Tag Team Championship (Amarillo version) (1 time)

Karl and Kurt Von Brauner #1
American Wrestling Association
AWA World Tag Team Championship (Indiana version) (1 time)
National Wrestling Alliance
NWA World Tag Team Championship (Mid-America version) (8 times) 
NWA Southern Tag Team Championship (Mid-America version) (2 times)
NWA Southern Tag Team Championship (Mid-Atlantic version) (1 time) 
NWA World Tag Team Championship (Florida version) (6 times) 
NWA World Tag Team Championship (Texas version) (1 time) 
NWA World Tag Team Championship (Georgia version) (3 times)
World Wrestling Association
WWA World Tag Team Championship (1 time)

Karl and Eric Von Brauner
National Wrestling Alliance
NWA World Tag Team Championship (Mid-America version) (2 times)
NWA World Tag Team Championship (Georgia version) (1 time)

Karl and Kurt Von Brauner #2
National Wrestling Alliance
NWA World Tag Team Championship (Mid-America version) (10 times)
NWA World Tag Team Championship (Texas version) (3 times) 
NWA World Tag Team Championship (Tennessee version) (1 time) 
NWA World Tag Team Championship (Detroit version) (1 time) 
NWA World Tag Team Championship (San Francisco version) (2 times)

Kurt and Fritz Von Brauner
Georgia Championship Wrestling
NWA International Tag Team Championship (Georgia version) (1 time)

References

External links
The Von Brauners at OWW.com

American Wrestling Association teams and stables
Faux German professional wrestlers
Independent promotions teams and stables
Stampede Wrestling alumni